Shurestan in Qazvin Province may refer to:

Shurestan-e Olya, Qazvin
Shurestan-e Sofla, Qazvin